"Down in a Hole" is a power ballad by Alice in Chains, and the fifth and last single from their album Dirt (1992). It is the twelfth song on most pressings of the album and fourth or eleventh on others. The song was written by guitarist and vocalist Jerry Cantrell for his then-girlfriend, Courtney Clarke. The single spent 21 weeks on Billboard's Mainstream Rock Tracks and peaked at No. 10. The song was included on the compilation albums Nothing Safe: Best of the Box (1999) and Music Bank (1999). An acoustic version performed on Alice in Chains' MTV Unplugged in 1996 was released in a live album and DVD.

Origin and recording
Songwriter and guitarist Jerry Cantrell was at first hesitant to present the song to the band, feeling that the song was too soft, but after a positive response from the band, they followed through and recorded it. The composition is written in A minor, utilizing Dorian mode, and is centered mainly around Ab minor - Gb major - Db major chord progression, with Layne Staley's and Jerry Cantrell's vocal parts intricately harmonizing.

Lyrics
Jerry Cantrell wrote the song for his then-girlfriend, Courtney Clarke. In the liner notes of 1999's Music Bank box set collection, Cantrell said of the song:
["Down in a Hole"]'s in my top three, personally. It's to my long-time love. It's the reality of my life, the path I've chosen and in a weird way it kind of foretold where we are right now. It's hard for us to both understand...that this life is not conducive to much success with long-term relationships.

Release and reception
"Down in a Hole" was released as a single in 1993. "Down in a Hole" peaked at number ten on the Billboard Mainstream Rock Tracks chart. The UK single was released in October 1993. "Down in a Hole" reached the top 40 in the UK and the top 30 in Ireland.

Ned Raggett of AllMusic said that "Staley's...half-strangled but still amazingly evocative performance...is heartfelt and almost yearning" and that "the end result feels like a ruined man looking for some sort of comfort."

Stereogum said of the song; "Down in a Hole" is an anthem of loss, revulsion, and depression. But it really is an anthem first and foremost. The verses build slowly to a soaring chorus with an irrepressible melody. Staley's pained howl guides the song, but its power derives from Cantrell's terrific harmonies, which give the piece heft and also a sense of unease."

Music video
"Down in a Hole" became one of the five video-singles from the album Dirt. The music video was released in 1993 and was directed by Nigel Dick. The video is available on the home video release Music Bank: The Videos. Bassist Mike Inez appears in the video although the original track was recorded with original member Mike Starr.

Live performances
Alice in Chains performed the song live for the first time on October 5, 1992 at the Coca-Cola Starplex in Dallas, Texas.

Alice in Chains performed an acoustic version of "Down in a Hole" for its appearance on MTV Unplugged in 1996, and the song was included on the Unplugged live album and home video release.

Another acoustic live version of "Down in a Hole" featuring new vocalist William DuVall on lead vocals is included on the Japanese version of Black Gives Way to Blue (2009) as a bonus track.

Cover versions
The song was covered by professional baseball player Bronson Arroyo on his 2005 album, Covering the Bases, which lists the song as "Down in the Hole".

On his low-key 2007 tour—in support of his album Easy Tiger, Ryan Adams covered the song live with his band, The Cardinals. A cover of the song is also featured on Adams' 2007 EP Follow the Lights.

The Vitamin String Quartet recorded an instrumental version of the song for their 2009 album "The String Quartet Tribute to Alice in Chains".
 
The Christian metal band Demon Hunter perform an acoustic version of the song on the deluxe edition of their 2011 album The World Is a Thorn.

Swedish metal band In Flames covered the song on their covers EP, "Down, Wicked & No Good", released in  November 2017.

American hardcore punk band Code Orange covered the song on their live album Under the Skin in 2020.

In popular culture
"Down in a Hole" was released as a downloadable content for the music video game Rocksmith 2014 on December 12, 2017, as part of the Alice in Chains Song Pack II, which also includes the songs "Rooster", "No Excuses", "Nutshell" and "Heaven Beside You".

The song is also available as a DLC for the Xbox One and PlayStation 4 game Rock Band 4.

Track listings
CD single (659751-2)
 "Down in a Hole" (radio edit) – 3:53
 "Down in a Hole" – 5:40
 "What the Hell Have I" – 4:00
 "Rooster" – 6:15

12-inch single (659751-6)

Side 1
 "Down in a Hole"
 "A Little Bitter"
Side 2
 "Rooster"
 "Love, Hate, Love"

7-inch single (659751-7)

Side 1
 "Down in a Hole" (radio edit)
Side 2
 "Rooster"

Personnel
 Layne Staley – lead vocals
 Jerry Cantrell – vocals, lead guitar, acoustic guitar
 Mike Starr – bass
 Sean Kinney – drums

Charts

Certifications

Release history

References

External links
 "Down in a Hole" on Setlist.fm

1990s ballads
1993 singles
Alice in Chains songs
Songs written by Jerry Cantrell
Songs about heartache
1992 songs
Columbia Records singles
Alternative rock ballads